Wolf Creek is a stream in the U.S. state of West Virginia. It is a tributary of Greenbrier River.

Wolf Creek was so named for the fact the creek was a favorite trapping ground of wolves.

See also
List of rivers of West Virginia

References

Rivers of Summers County, West Virginia
Rivers of West Virginia